La Chapelle-Neuve is the name of several communes in France:

La Chapelle-Neuve, in the Côtes-d'Armor department
La Chapelle-Neuve, in the Morbihan department

See also 
Chapelle (disambiguation)